Sea Life Porto is an aquarium located in Porto, Portugal.

It opened on 15 June 2009 and is one of the Sea Life Centres in Europe, which are owned by Merlin Entertainments.

External links

Sea Life Centres
Aquaria in Portugal
Museums in Porto
Tourist attractions in Porto
Modernist architecture in Portugal